Priscilla Wong Tsui-yu (born 23 October 1981) is a Hong Kong actress and television host. Wong made her debut in 2003, anchoring i-Cable entertainment news program before signing with TVB in 2012 as an actress.

Early life
Priscilla Wong was the second child of the five girls. Her father worked as a fish monger while her mother was a homemaker. She graduated from Pentecostal Lam Hon Kwong secondary school in 2000.

Wong later attended and graduated from Hong Kong Baptist University in 2003, majoring in communications and public relations. During university, Wong took an internship at i-Cable and was later offered a full-time job as a host when she graduated from university.

Career

Hosting
Priscilla Wong was discovered while she was in Secondary School at the age of 17 by Sandy Yu who was then an artiste management exec and later became a top TVB drama production executive. Signed under management by Sundream Motion Pictures she did not fully start her career in the entertainment industry until after graduating from university. Wong worked as an anchor for travelogue programs and entertainment news reporter for i-Cable. She was dubbed as "Stephen Chow's personal host", due to her easy access to interviewing the famous comedian.

In 2010 Wong left i-Cable for Now TV, only to return one year later.

Wong won Best Host at the 2013 TVB Anniversary Awards for the tourism television program Pilgrimage of Wealth 2 alongside Tony Hung. She won the award again as a co-host for the program Dodo Goes Shopping Sr. 2 in 2017.

Acting
In 2008, Wong starred opposite veteran actor Dicky Cheung in the film The Champions. In 2012, she signed an artiste contract with TVB. In 2013, she took part in her first TVB drama, Reality Check, and starred as the female lead in the costume drama Karma Rider. With her performances in the dramas Return of the Silver Tongue and Swipe Tap Love, Wong won the Most Improved Female Artiste award at the 2014 TVB Anniversary Awards. 

In 2015, Wong starred in the drama Madam Cutie On Duty, receiving attention for her onscreen partnership with co-actor Edwin Siu. With her role as Apple Fa, she was placed among top 5 for Most Popular Female Character nomination at the 2015 TVB Anniversary Awards. Wong starred opposite Bosco Wong and Edwin Siu in the 2016 drama Two Steps From Heaven, for which she was placed among top 5 for the Best Actress nomination at the 2016 TVB Anniversary Awards. 

In 2017, Wong starred in the crime drama Line Walker: The Prelude. She played Cheng Shuk Mui, an amateur undercover cop who infiltrated a crime organisation. She collaborated with Bosco Wong again in the 2018 drama Heart and Greed. In 2020, Wong starred in the melodrama Life After Death as Laura Fong, a single mother who struggled to get over the death of her husband. She reprised her role as Cheng Shuk Mui in the sequel Line Walker: Bull Fight. In 2021, she starred in the drama Battle Of The Seven Sisters, playing the barrister Alison Koo.

Personal life
In 2014, Wong started dating Madam Cutie On Duty co-actor Edwin Siu. The couple married in April 2018, in New Zealand.

Filmography

As actress

Television series

Film

As host

i-Cable

Now TV

TVB

Awards and nominations

References

External links

 

Hong Kong television actresses
1981 births
Living people
21st-century Hong Kong actresses
Hong Kong television personalities
Hong Kong television presenters
Hong Kong women television presenters
Alumni of Hong Kong Baptist University